Achilleion is a proposed residential complex in Colombo, Sri Lanka. Upon completion, the complex is planned to consist of two twin skyscrapers of 50 floors each, connected by two skybridges; one at the centre of the towers and the other at the top, functioning as a helipad.

It is claimed to be the tallest stand-alone show apartment in the world. Construction of the buildings commenced in January 2017.

See also 
 List of tallest structures in Sri Lanka

References

External links 
 
 

Proposed skyscrapers
Residential skyscrapers in Sri Lanka
Apartment buildings in Colombo